Charles Duncombe may refer to:

Charles Duncombe (English banker) (1648–1711), English banker, MP and Lord Mayor
Charles Duncombe, 1st Baron Feversham (1764–1841), English MP
Charles Duncombe (Upper Canada Rebellion) (1792–1867), American physician and politician in Canada and USA
Charles Duncombe, 2nd Earl of Feversham (1879–1916), English Conservative MP; known as Viscount Helmsley 1881–1915
Charles Duncombe, 3rd Earl of Feversham (1906–1963), English Conservative MP; son of 2nd Earl; Viscount Helmsley 1915–1916

See also
Duncombe (disambiguation)